Pseudosetipinna haizhouensis is a species of anchovy found in the waters around China.  It is the only species in its genus.

References

Anchovies
Monotypic ray-finned fish genera
Fish of Asia
Fish described in 1988